The 1978–79 Liga Leumit season saw Maccabi Tel Aviv win the title, whilst Hapoel Hadera, Hapoel Jerusalem and Hapoel Rishon LeZion (in their first season back in the top division since 1952) were relegated to Liga Artzit. Oded Machnes (Maccabi Netanya) and Eli Miali (Beitar Jerusalem) were the league's joint top scorers with 18 goals.

Final table

Results

References
Israel - List of final tables RSSSF

Liga Leumit seasons
Israel
1978–79 in Israeli football leagues